Legia Warsaw was an ice hockey team in Warsaw, Poland. Formerly a top-level team in the country, they most recently played in the second-level of Polish hockey, the Polish 1. Liga.

The club was founded in 1927. They won fourteen Polska Liga Hokejowa titles from 1933 to 1967. Between 1982 and 2005, the club was liquidated, and returned to I liga in 2006. The team has remained in the second-level. The team did not participate in the 2015/16 season, and has temporarily suspended operations due to financial constraints.

Achievements
Polish Championship: 
Winners (13) : 1933, 1951, 1952, 1953, 1954, 1955, 1956, 1957, 1959, 1961, 1963, 1964, 1967.
2nd Place (7) : 1928, 1931, 1958, 1960, 1962, 1965, 1966
3rd Place (3): 1929, 1930, 1949

External links
Official website

Ice hockey teams in Poland
Sport in Warsaw